Gayle L. Goldin is an American politician and a former Democratic member of the Rhode Island Senate representing District 3 from January 2013 to August 2021. She is originally from Montreal, Canada, having immigrated to the United States at a young age. 

Goldin resigned from the senate in August 2021 to become the Deputy Director of the Women's Bureau of the United States Department of Labor under the Biden administration.

Education
Goldin earned her BA in English literature from McGill University and her MA in public policy from Tufts University.

Rhode Island Senate 
Goldin was a member of the Senate Democratic Caucus, of which she was the Deputy Majority Whip.

Shortly after her election to the Senate, Goldin was the primary sponsor of the Temporary Disability Insurance bill, which made Rhode Island the third state to offer temporary benefits to workers "take time off for a seriously ill child, spouse, parent, domestic partner or to bond with a new child."

Goldin successfully sponsored an bill in 2016 which requires Rhode Island schools to educate students about the Holocaust and other genocides.

She is also an outspoken advocate for other women in politics and publicly detailed the sexism faced by women at the Rhode Island Statehouse.

Committee assignments 
Goldin was a member of the following committees:

 Committee on Health & Human Services, Vice Chair
 Committee on Labor
 Committee on Environment and Agriculture, Secretary

Electoral history

No other candidates filed for election in the 2020 District 3 Democratic Primary and it was subsequently cancelled.

References

External links
Official page at the Rhode Island General Assembly
Campaign site

Gayle Goldin at Ballotpedia
Gayle L. Goldin at the National Institute on Money in State Politics

Place of birth missing (living people)
Year of birth missing (living people)
Living people
McGill University alumni
Politicians from Providence, Rhode Island
Democratic Party Rhode Island state senators
Tufts University School of Arts and Sciences alumni
Women state legislators in Rhode Island
21st-century American politicians
21st-century American women politicians